Prionapteron is a monotypic moth genus of the family Crambidae described by Stanisław Błeszyński in 1965. It contains only one species, Prionapteron tenebrella, described by George Hampson in 1896. It is found in China (Hubei, Sichuan, Shensi, Fukien, Kwangtung).

References

Monotypic moth genera
Crambidae genera
Taxa named by Stanisław Błeszyński